Utah State Route 91 may refer to:

 U.S. Route 91 in Utah, the state highway designation (legislative overlay) for the current alignment of U.S. Route 91 within Utah, United States, that runs from Interstate 15/Interstate 84 in Brigham City to the Idaho state line on the north edge of Cove (through Box Elder and Cache counties)
 Utah State Route 91 (1935-1969), a former state highway in northeastern Sanpete County, Utah, that connected U.S. Route 89 in Fairview with Milburn

See also

 List of state highways in Utah
 List of U.S. Highways in Utah
 List of highways numbered 91

External links

 Utah Department of Transportation Highway Resolutions: Route 91 (PDF)